Hilina may refer to:

 Dalla hilina, butterfly in the family Hesperiidae, found in Venezuela
 Hilina Berhanu Degefa, Ethiopian women's rights activist
 Hilina Slump, section of the Big Island of Hawaii